Pidham Hill is a hill in the county of Hampshire, England. The summit elevation is  AMSL. Pidham Hill is about 2 kilometres east-northeast of the village of East Meon in Hampshire, north of the road to Langrish. It is part of the East Hampshire Hangers of the Hampshire Downs and is located near to where the Hangers merge with the South Downs.

References 

Hills of Hampshire